A microregion was a legally defined area in Brazil consisting of a group of municipalities. They were abolished in 2017 and replaced by "immediate geographic regions". Microregions were grouped together into mesoregions. In theory, Brazilian law provided for member municipalities to cooperate on matters of common interest, but in practice, the divisions were used primarily for statistical purposes by the Brazilian Institute of Geography and Statistics.

List of microregions
In 2014, there were 5,570 municipalities, divided among 558 microregions and 137 mesoregions:

References

 
Demographics of Brazil
.Microregions
.
Microregions
Subdivisions of Brazil